Vamo arriba is an Uruguayan daytime television show broadcast by Channel 4. It debuted on December 3, 2018  and is presented by Giannina Silva, Gastón González and Federico Paz. The weekday program airs from 10:30 a.m. to 12:30 p.m. It was expanded to weekends with the debut of a Sunday edition on August 21, 2021.

History 
The program began to be broadcast on December 3, 2018, as part of a renovation and structuring of the morning programming of Channel 4. The first guest of the program was the historic figure of the Uruguayan carnival, Julio "Kanela" Sosa and the first dish cooked was a chivito.

Sections 

 Jenga Vila: Andy Vila leads this game where she and the guest must play Jenga, while the interview is held. 
 Sal o Pimienta: Viewers communicate to play and participate for a $20,000 cash prize. Conducted by Gastón González.
 Móvil en vivo: Pablo Magno leaves the studio and transmits from different parts of the city.

On-air staff 
Weekday editions
 Giannina Silva (Co-Host; 2022–present)
 Gastón González (Co-Host; 2018–present)
 Federico Paz (Co-Host; 2018–present)
 Marcelo Bornio (Chef; 2018–present)
 Anahí Lange (Reporter; 2018–present)
Sunday editions

 Luis Alberto Carballo (Co-Host; 2021–present)
 Analaura Barreto (Co-Host; 2021–present)
 Alejandro Sonsol (Co-Host; 2021–present)

Former on-air staff 

 Pablo Magno (Reporter; 2018–2021)
 Andy Vila (Co-Host; 2018–2022)

Sunday edition 
Due to the good audience ratings of the program, and a new change in the channel's programming, a Sunday edition of the program was released on August 21, 2021, entitled Vamo Arriba que es Domingo. Hosted by Luis Alberto Carballo, Analaura Barreto and Alejandro Sonsol, the first broadcast led the audience with an average audience share of 6.4 points according to Kantar Ibope Media.

References

External links 

 Official website

2018 Uruguayan television series debuts
2010s Uruguayan television series
Spanish-language television shows
Canal 4 (Uruguayan TV channel) original programming